The Lapidary Museum is a lapidarium-museum in Avignon, France. It has housed the classical Greek, Etruscan, Roman and Gallo-Roman sculptures and objects of the Calvet Museum since the 1980s. They are both run by the Fondation Calvet. As well as exhibiting the museum's core collections, it also mounts summer temporary exhibitions (e.g. "La diffusion des cultes égyptiens et alexandrins dans le monde romain à L'Égypte copte et l'Égypte musulmane" and "Le laraire d'Esprit Calvet"), conferences and networking events, particularly for scholars.

The museum is based at 27 rue de la République in a 17th-century building, previously the chapel of the city's Jesuit College. It was begun in 1616, initially to plans by Étienne Martelange and then by François de Royers de la Valfenière from 1620 onwards. de la Valfenière raised the walls as far as the nave's main cornice. The building was made a monument historique on 21 June 1928.

Collections 
As well as Etruria, classical Greece and Rome and the Gallo-Roman era, the collections cover Gallic and Early Christian art. The highlight of the prehistoric collections is the 'Lauris-Puyvert Stela' in ologenic limestone. The Greek, Roman, Etruscan and Gallic objects include vases and lamps as well as bas-reliefs and statues, along with a number of Etruscan funerary monuments.

Greece

Statues
 Apollo Sauroctonus, head lost, 1st century AD
 Woman in a chlamys and chiton, head lost, 2nd century BC
 Athena in a peplos, the skin of the goat Amalthea, the Gorgoneion and a plumed Corinthian helmet decorated with rams' heads

Steles 
 Stela of a young woman in a tunic and mantle between two Doric columns, with a female slave presenting her with a duck, marble, Attican, 399-375 BC
 Young woman in a tunic and peplos holding her hand to her hair - Attican, 399-375 BC
 Stela of Menodotos - Woman in a chiton and himation sitting on a stool beside a standing man, all between two Corinthian columns and a triangular pediment
 Stela of Glykon and his son Tateis - upper register showing Hecate in her triple form with Demeter to the right, Men to the left and a crescent moon in the background; lower register showing the busts of a woman and a boy - 4th century BC
 Stela - seated woman with her feet on a stool holding an oblong object (possibly an egg or fruit) out to a snake, with a female slave to the left ina long tunic and handing another object to her mistress - Cyclades, 1st or 2nd century BC

Reliefs and objects

Vases

Roman sculptures 
 Veiled woman holding a patera in her right hand, possibly a priestess or goddess
 Woman with a dolphin, head lost
 Funerary urn, marble, with an epitaph to C. Silius Herma and his slave
 Funerary urn, rectangular, marble, with an epitaph to Marcus Domitius Urbicus 
 Man's head
 Two-headed Hermes

Gaul

Early Christian

See also
 List of Jesuit sites

Bibliography 
 Joseph Girard, Évocation du Vieil Avignon, Les Éditions de Minuit, Paris, 2000,

References

Museums in Avignon
Archaeological museums in France